Tracy Gahan (born July 18, 1980) is an American retired professional basketball player.

Career

College
In college, Gahan attended Iowa State University in Ames, Iowa.

Iowa State statistics

Source

WNBA
After her college career, Gahan was picked 46th overall by the New York Liberty in the 2002 WNBA draft. However, she was soon released. After strong showings during her championship season in Australia, Gahan was invited to the Connecticut Sun's training camp before the 2008 WNBA season. Gahan was released before the season began.

Europe
After spending an additional year at college to complete her degree, Gahan began her career in Greece. In 2003, she spent her first season with Peiraikos, before moving to Panathinaikos for her second season in A1 Ethniki Women's Basketball. In 2005, Gahan travelled west to Ireland, playing for DCU Mercy in the Irish Women's Super League. After a season away, she returned in 2007 after her Australian season concluded, signing with Botaş SK for the conclusion of the Turkish season.

After three years in Australia, Gahan played for PTS Lider Pruszków in Poland's Basket Liga Kobiet. Towards the end of the 2009–10 season, she switched to Tęcza Leszno for the remainder of her time in Poland.

Australia
In 2006, Gahan signed with the Adelaide Lightning to play in the Women's National Basketball League, Australia's premier women's league and the strongest league in the southern hemisphere. In her second season with the Lightning, Gahan was awarded a place in the WNBL All-Star Five for 2007–08. The Lightning would also go on to take home the 2007–08 WNBL Championship. She returned to the league in 2010, signing with the Dandenong Rangers.

Personal life
Gahan is married to former Adelaide Lightning teammate, WNBA player and Australian Olympian, Erin Phillips. They have three children, twins Blake and Brooklyn born in November 2016, and Drew, born in July 2019.

References

1980 births
Living people
Adelaide Lightning players
American women's basketball players
Basketball players from Texas
Botaş SK players
Dandenong Rangers players
Forwards (basketball)
Iowa State Cyclones women's basketball players
LGBT people from Texas
LGBT basketball players
American LGBT sportspeople
New York Liberty draft picks
Panathinaikos WBC players
People from McKinney, Texas
Lesbian sportswomen